Mobility as a service (MaaS) is a software-based, online enterprise mobility solution that allows companies to manage employees' mobile devices.  As with on-demand cloud computing services, on-site servers and support hardware are not required.  The mobile applications platform and device management features are provided for a single monthly service charge.
Features of MaaS platforms can include the ability to provision, manage and secure devices from a single portal, along with support for existing enterprise apps, centralized policy management, secure content using containers, and reporting and analytics for the overall system.

See also
 Platform as a service
 Software as a service

References

As a service